Adnan Zakir (born 23 December 1986) is a former professional field hockey player from Pakistan. He was born in the coastal town of Karachi, Pakistan. Zakir played both midfielder and striker positions for the national Pakistan men's national field hockey team. He made his international debut in January 2001 playing as a junior player against England U-21. He continued to represent the country and played his first international game as a senior player in June 2004 against India.

Zakir later transitioned to coaching in 2008 and is currently the Head Coach of St Albans Hockey Club and the Director of Coaching Newmarket, Suffolk Hockey Club.

Early career 
Zakir started his professional career in 1999 playing for the National Bank of Pakistan hockey team. His first coach was Tahir Zaman, who played for Pakistan’s national field hockey team and later on served as its captain. His first major national tournament was the National Senior Championship, which was played in August 1999.

Coaching career 
Zakir also started coaching teams while playing professionally then moved to a full-time coaching position at a national and eventually an international level.

National 
 Strength and conditioning Coach and Sports Nutritionist of Pakistan men's national field hockey team 2013-2014

International  
 Strength & conditioning Coach and assisting Head Coach of Azerbaijan men's national field hockey team 2013-2015.
 Strengthen & Conditioning Coach and Assistant Coach of Egypt men's national field hockey team 2010-2012.
 Director of Coaching and Head Coach of Ipswich Hockey Club 2015-2017.
 Head of IHC academy 2015-2016.
 Hockey coach and Strength and Conditioning coach of Ipswich High School 2016-present.
 Head coach of Sutton Valence Hockey Club (Champions of the league) 2014-2015.
 Head coach of Sutton Valance School 2011-2015
 Head coach of Burnt Ash Hockey Club (Champions of the League) 2012-2013.
 Player/Coach of Old Loughtonians Hockey Club South-East Division 1 2012-2014]
 Head coach of Academy and Player/coach of Holcombe Hockey Club South-East Division 1 2008-2012
 Director and Head Coach at Newmarket Hockey Club 2015-present
 Head coach of St Albans Hockey Club from 2017-present

Coaching qualifications 
 Hockey Coach (Level 1 and Level 2) awarded by England Hockey Board (2008-2009)
 Diploma in Fitness Instructing Personal Training and Strength and Conditioning awarded by Premier Internationals, Premier Global, The Training room and England Hockey Board.
 Level 4 High-Performance Strength and Conditioning Coach
 Member of FIH Youth Penal 2004
 Brand Ambassador of Evo Hockey Camps (Sponsored by Grays International)

See also 
Pakistan Hockey Federation
List of Pakistani field hockey players

References

External links 
 
 Adnan zakir at 2006 Commonwealth Games
  Ipswich High School Staff List PDF file

Field hockey players from Karachi
1986 births
Living people
Pakistani male field hockey players
Male field hockey midfielders
Male field hockey defenders
Field hockey players at the 2006 Commonwealth Games
2006 Men's Hockey World Cup players
Commonwealth Games medallists in field hockey
Commonwealth Games silver medallists for Pakistan
Medallists at the 2006 Commonwealth Games